Five Nights at Freddy's (FNaF) is a media franchise created by Scott Cawthon. The first video game of the same name was released on August 8, 2014, and the resultant series has since gained worldwide popularity.

The main series consists of nine video games taking place in locations connected to a fictional family pizza restaurant franchise named "Freddy Fazbear's Pizza", after its mascot, the animatronic bear Freddy Fazbear. In most games, the player assumes the role of a night-time employee, who must utilize tools such as security cameras, lights, doors, and vents to defend themselves against hostile animatronic characters that inhabit the locations. The series' lore is gradually revealed through voice recordings, minigames, and Easter eggs featured throughout the games.

The franchise also includes spin-off games and other media, such as a novel trilogy and an anthology series, comprising an all-encompassing fictional universe. The franchise maintains an active fanbase, known for its production of fan art and fangames, and merchandise for the games is available internationally.

History and development
The idea for Five Nights at Freddy's stemmed from negative reaction to Scott Cawthon's previous game, the family-friendly Chipper & Sons Lumber Co. Players said that the main character (a young beaver) looked like "a scary animatronic animal", and reviewer Jim Sterling called the game "unintentionally terrifying". Initially discouraged by the criticism, Cawthon (who had previously primarily developed Christian-oriented games) eventually used the feedback to make something intentionally scarier.

Five Nights at Freddy's was released via Desura on August 8, 2014. On August 20, after it was approved by the service's crowdsourcing platform Greenlight, Five Nights at Freddy's was also released on Steam. When the game was picked up by well-known YouTubers it became an internet sensation.

The sequels were released on November 10, 2014, March 2, 2015, July 23, 2015, October 7, 2016, December 4, 2017, June 27, 2018, May 28, 2019, November 25, 2019, and December 16, 2021, respectively. A spin-off from the series, FNaF World, was announced in a Steam post by Cawthon in September 2015, and was released in January 2016. Cawthon releases teasers for his games on his website, and trailers on his YouTube channel.

He used Clickteam Fusion 2.5 to create the Five Nights at Freddy's games and Autodesk 3ds Max to model and render the games' 3D graphics. To enhance Sister Location, Pizzeria Simulator, Ultimate Custom Night, Help Wanted, and Special Delivery, Cawthon used professional voice actors and original soundtracks. In May 2016, he announced that all titles would be remade by third-party companies for release on consoles.

Cawthon posted on his website in 2015 that he planned to publish his first novel (The Silver Eyes) in the near future, with its stories separate from that of the games. Cawthon also announced that it would be co-written by author Kira Breed-Wrisley. On June 20, 2016, Scholastic announced that it would collaborate with Cawthon on a multi-book deal. The Silver Eyes was released on December 17, 2015, on Amazon Kindle, and the paperback version was published on September 27, 2016, slightly earlier than its originally planned October publication date. A second novel, The Twisted Ones, was published on June 27, 2017, followed by The Fourth Closet on June 26, 2018.

Gameplay
The Five Nights at Freddy's series consists of horror-themed video games in which the player is usually a night-time employee at a location connected with Freddy Fazbear's Pizza, a fictional children's restaurant that takes inspiration from family pizza chains like Chuck E. Cheese's and ShowBiz Pizza Place. The restaurant has life-size animatronic characters that perform at children's parties. The animatronics wander the restaurant at night and the guard is instructed to watch over them. To progress through the games, the player must guard themselves against animatronics with a variety of tools. In Five Nights at Freddy's, the player can control the two security doors connecting their office to the adjacent hallways as a barrier against animatronics in the vicinity. Each night, the player has a power supply that depletes faster when a tool is used. If the power goes out, the player can no longer use any tools and is defenseless against the animatronics. Five Nights at Freddy's 2 has different tools; there are no protective doors, and the player must instead use an empty animatronic head and flashlight to defend themself against the animatronics. The game introduced a music box which must be remotely wound up on a regular basis to prevent an attack from a particular animatronic. 8-bit minigames were introduced, which are played randomly after death.

Five Nights at Freddy's 3 uses a monitor panel, which contains audio, camera, and ventilation. The player must keep certain systems from malfunctioning. These malfunctions can be triggered randomly or by the hallucinations of the animatronics from the first and second games. The ability to seal vents is also added and must be used to prevent the sole tangible animatronic from entering the office. The player can use an audio-based function on the cameras, which triggers a childlike voice to lure the animatronic away from the office. The 8-bit minigames return and are activated by completing side tasks such as clicking on a poster or inputting a code into a wall. If the player completes the minigames, they unlock a secret ending. In Five Nights at Freddy's 4, the gameplay occurs in a bedroom setting, and instead of being a nighttime security guard, the player takes the role of a small child. The player also no longer has access to a camera system. The player has four areas in the bedroom to monitor: two hallway doors on both sides of the room, the closet directly in front of them, and the bed behind them. At the doors, the player must listen for animatronics' breathing, which can determine whether they are near. If the player hears breathing at the side doors, they close the door and wait for the animatronics to walk away. If they open the doors too early, however, the animatronics jump scare the player. The player must also prevent small animatronics from accumulating on their bed, and prevent an animatronic from entering their closet. Five Nights at Freddy's 4 also introduces a minigame involving a new animatronic, which offers the player a two-hour skip in the next night for completing the minigame.

An elevated control pad is introduced for Sister Location, which can light a room or shock the animatronics. Other mechanics include a second control pad in a breaker room, which controls power to the facility and a flash beacon, which allows the player to see in the dark Funtime Auditorium (a party room) and avoid its animatronic. Sister Location is the only game where the player can move between rooms. Pizzeria Simulator has business-style gameplay, and the player must spend in-game money to buy features for their pizzeria. A series of minigames can be played by testing the establishment's attractions. After the player has completed this portion of the game, they complete tasks in a room and fend off hostile, previously salvaged animatronics. The gameplay of Pizzeria Simulator shares a number of elements with Five Nights at Freddy's 3, including the importance of ventilation and the ability to distract animatronics with sound. Ultimate Custom Night is a customizable night, in which fifty animatronics are present and have a maximum AI level of twenty. The game includes many mechanics from the previous games, such as the heater, fan, music box, and power generator. The player can choose which characters they want active for a night, and how active the characters will be.

Help Wanted combines the gameplay of every other game, and turns into a virtual experience for the player. It also introduces several other minigames, in which the gameplay is variant, and also at times has free-roam. Special Delivery features location-based augmented reality gameplay. The player can switch on their camera, and the footage itself is the game's background. The animatronics will try to attack corresponding to the environment. The animatronics generally have cloaking, which leads them to being invisible.

Common elements

Security cameras
In the first, second, third, seventh, and eighth games, the player has a security-camera system, which observes the animatronic characters. One location can be viewed at a time, and some areas are not visible on the cameras. Most camera feeds are dull, sometimes almost black and white in color, and full of video noise. In the third game, the cameras stop working if their associated system fails. Cameras are used in the fifth game as a mechanic in the fake ending and custom night update, but not in the main game.

Lights
In the first, second, fourth, fifth, sixth, eighth, and ninth games, lights are used to ward off animatronics or warn the player. Lights in the first, second, fifth, seventh, eighth games are activated with buttons on the walls and illuminate the player's blind spots: the doorway or vent exit, respectively. The lights are similar in the fifth game, but are mounted on a control pad and illuminate the animatronics' rooms. The flashlight in the second and ninth games has a finite battery life, but is infinite in the fourth and seventh games, and must be switched on or off. Battery life varies in the eighth game. The flash beacon, introduced in the fifth game, is used to orient the player in the third and fifth nights' pitch-black rooms. The flashlight is also used in the sixth game, but it is automatically turned on when the player looks at the vents and has unlimited power.

Doors and vents
In the first, fourth, seventh, and eighth games, doors are to be closed when an animatronic is near. Doors are also present in the fake ending and custom night update of the fifth game with the same function. Vents are featured in the second, third, sixth, seventh, and eighth games, as a medium through which animatronics can get to the player. They are also present in the fifth game as the primary means of transport for the player.

Jump scares
Every game in the main series contains jump scares, which end a game in defeat as the animatronics are implied to attack the player off-screen. In most jump scares, an animatronic character suddenly appears in the player's view, followed by a loud screaming or roaring noise. Some jump scares, including those by Golden Freddy (in the first game), Nightmare, and Nightmarionne (in the fourth game), consist of a single screen with shrill, distorted audio; these jump scares usually crash (or restart) the game. The player must use various tools to prevent being attacked via jump scares and advance through each game.

Minigames

In the second, third, fourth, fifth, sixth, and eighth games, the player gains access to a series of (predominantly eight-bit) minigames randomly after death, or after completing a specific task. The minigames usually relate to a story or event relevant to the game, in a cryptic manner. The minigames in the second game portray homicides mentioned by another worker of the restaurant, and the reason of the animatronics gaining life. The minigames in the third game show the story behind Springtrap's creation. Minigames in the fourth game tell the story of a character who dies in a tragic accident. There is only one minigame in the fifth game, which depicts the death of animatronic engineer William Afton's daughter. The minigames in the sixth game depict various events in the series, all connected to Afton. In the mobile version of the seventh game, the player can access a minigame called "Princess Quest", which depicts the origins of a character called Vanny.

Phone calls
In the first, second, third, seventh, and eighth games, the player receives a telephone voice message from a veteran worker of the location. The messages are a tutorial for the player, describing several gameplay mechanics and outlining the location's backstory. Phone calls from the first game can be heard in the fourth game as ambience. The fifth, sixth, eighth, and ninth games have AI voices which tutor the player. The sixth game also contains a tape recorder that guides the player through some gameplay mechanics.

Easter eggs
Every game in the series contains easter eggs and rare screens, some of which add to the story. They are often presented as hallucinations, with some examples including a character named Golden Freddy in the first game, eight-bit minigames in the second and third games, various random items appearing near the bed in the fourth, blueprints in the fifth and sixth and a minigame called Princess Quest in the seventh.

Closings
In the first, second, third, fifth, and sixth games, the player's location closes shortly after the game ends. In the first game, the location is said to close by the year's end due to a "tragedy that took place there many years ago". In the second game, the location closes due to malfunctioning animatronics. In the third and sixth games, the locations close after a fire. The fifth game is unique, however, in that the restaurant in which the game takes place, Circus Baby's Pizza World, closes before the events of the game due to a supposed gas leak.

Characters

Animatronics 

The first game features four main anthropomorphic mascot characters: Freddy Fazbear, Bonnie, Chica, and Foxy the Pirate. A yellow apparition of Freddy Fazbear, nicknamed "Golden Freddy" occasionally appears as an easter egg.

Variations of these characters appear frequently throughout the series, alongside new ones.

Humans
The franchise features seven main human characters:

 William Afton (voiced by P. J. Heywood in Sister Location, Pizzeria Simulator, Ultimate Custom Night, and Special Delivery) is the series' central character and main antagonist. The founder of Afton Robotics, LLC, he is responsible for the creation of the Funtime Animatronics, and one of the co-founders of Fazbear Entertainment, Inc. Afton was first introduced in the minigames of Five Nights at Freddy's 2, depicted as an unnamed purple figure identified colloquially as the "Purple Guy". These minigames, as well as those from later installments, establish Afton as a child murderer, who killed at least six children (Gabriel, Jeremy, Susie, Fritz, Cassidy, and Charlotte Emily) before the events of the series; these children's spirits would go on to haunt some of the animatronic characters of the franchise, including Freddy Fazbear, Bonnie, Chica, Foxy, Golden Freddy, and the Puppet. Afton himself was killed due to mechanical malfunctions of the Spring Bonnie suit he had worn during the murders and has appeared post-mortem as various incarnations throughout the series; most notably as Springtrap in Five Nights at Freddy's 3, Scraptrap in Pizzeria Simulator, and Burntrap in Security Breach. He has also been speculated to be the protagonist of Ultimate Custom Night, where he endures torment in either hell or his nightmares at the hands of the vengeful Cassidy, who refuses to let Afton die. A character known as Glitchtrap, or "the Anomaly", appears as the main antagonist of Five Nights at Freddy's: Help Wanted, and it has been debated among fans whether he is the real Afton or a digital copy of his consciousness.
 Michael Afton (voiced by P. J. Heywood in Sister Location), William's eldest son, has been the protagonist of several games in the series, making his debut in Five Nights at Freddy's: Sister Location. However, he has been speculated to be the player character of some of the earlier installments under several fake aliases, possibly including "Mike Schmidt" in the first game, "Fritz Smith" in Five Nights at Freddy's 2, the unnamed security guard in Five Nights at Freddy's 3, and the older brother in Five Nights at Freddy's 4. His motives are cryptic and not very well-known, although it is agreed upon that he is a central character in the overarching story of the franchise.
 The main protagonist of the Five Nights at Freddy's 4 minigames is a young boy who has been traumatized by Fazbear Entertainment's animatronics due to bullying from his older brother. The child was fatally injured by a Fredbear animatronic, and fell into a coma before eventually dying. Unnamed in-game, he is identified colloquially as the Crying Child.
 A humanoid animatronic by the name of Circus Baby (voiced by Heather Masters in Sister Location, Ultimate Custom Night, Help Wanted, and Special Delivery) serves as the main antagonist of Sister Location and a supporting antagonist in Pizzeria Simulator, where she is referred to as "Scrap Baby" (voiced by Heather Masters in Pizzeria Simulator and Ultimate Custom Night). In the minigames of Sister Location and the canon ending of Pizzeria Simulator, she is revealed to be possessed by Elizabeth Afton (voiced by Zehra Jane Naqvi in Sister Location'''s cutscenes), the daughter of William Afton and sister of Michael and the Crying Child. Her motives differ in the two games, as in the former she wishes to escape the facility where she and the other Funtime Animatronics are being held by occupying Michael's body, while in the latter she seeks to make her father proud by killing Michael. Circus Baby has been a recurring character in other Five Nights at Freddy's media since.
 The Puppet (voiced by Jena Rundus in Ultimate Custom Night), introduced in Five Nights at Freddy's 2, plays a prominent role in the backstory of Five Nights as Freddy's as the one responsible for the murdered children's spirits haunting the animatronics. In Pizzeria Simulator, it is revealed that the Puppet is haunted by the spirit of Charlotte, the daughter of William Afton's former business partner and the other Fazbear Entertainment co-founder, Henry Emily, who is implied in several minigames to be Afton's first victim. Henry himself is featured in Pizzeria Simulator as "Cassette Man" (voiced by Dave Steele in Pizzeria Simulator), replacing the guide characters ("Phone Guy", "Phone Dude", and "HandUnit") from the previous installments. Different versions of Charlotte (referred to as "Charlie") and Henry appear in the first Five Nights at Freddy's novel trilogy, with the former serving as the main protagonist who is subsequently revealed to be a robot possessed by the soul of the deceased original Charlotte.
 Gregory (voiced by Marta Svetek in Security Breach) is a young boy who is trapped in the Mega Pizzaplex overnight, and must survive against several hacked mascot characters and automated security robots. Among the robots are two humans; Vanessa the security guard (voiced by Heather Masters in Security Breach), and a woman in a white rabbit costume known as "Vanny" (voiced by Jessica Tang in Help Wanted, Stacey Young in the first trailer of Security Breach, and Marta Svetek in the finalized Security Breach), who are implied to be one and the same. Vanny previously appeared as the player character in Help Wanted, where William Afton's spirit somehow possessed her via the form of Glitchtrap to continue his killings, and she now suffers from dissociative identity disorder.
 A veteran staff member known as the Phone Guy (voiced by Scott Cawthon in FNAF1, FNAF2, FNAF3, Ultimate Custom Night, and Help Wanted) provides information and advice via taped recordings in the first three games, posthumously in the third following his death at the hands of the animatronics in the first game's fourth night. This exposition role is spiritually succeeded by the "Phone Dude" (voiced by Cawthon in FNAF3 and Help Wanted), a man involved in setting up the Fazbear's Fright horror attraction in the third game, Henry Emily/the "Cassette Man" in Pizzeria Simulator, and the "Tape Girl" (voiced by Briana Kennedy in Help Wanted), a former developer and beta tester for the in-universe Help Wanted VR game who leaves audio files warning future beta testers about "the Anomaly", Glitchtrap. Some games feature artificial intelligences of dubiously made quality as helpers for the protagonist or simple background characters, including HandUnit in Sister Location and Help Wanted, Tutorial Unit in Pizzeria Simulator and Special Delivery, and Dread Unit in Security Breach (all three voiced by Andy Field in their respective games).

Additional humans include Jeremy Fitzgerald (the main night guard that the player controls in Five Nights at Freddy's 2) and miscellaneous staff of the revived Fazbear Entertainment, Inc. (mentioned by Tape Girl and through text messages found in Special Delivery and Security Breach).

Games

Main series
Five Nights at Freddy's (2014)Five Nights at Freddy's was released for Microsoft Windows on August 8, 2014, followed by ports for Android and iOS on August 27 and September 11, respectively. A Windows Phone version was also released, but was soon withdrawn due to its downscaled graphics. Ports for the PlayStation 4, Xbox One and Nintendo Switch were released on November 29, 2019, alongside separate releases for Five Nights at Freddy's 2, 3 and 4.

The first game revolves around a character called Mike Schmidt, who begins working as a night security guard at Freddy Fazbear's Pizza, where the animatronics move at night and supposedly kill anyone they see by stuffing them into a spare animatronic suit. Animatronic movement is explained to the player as a purposely-programmed "free-roaming" mode, to prevent the animatronic's servomotors from locking up. The player must survive from 12 a.m. to 6 a.m. They cannot leave the room and must use a camera system and two doors with lights to defend themselves from the animatronics, with limited power to use their tools. The hostility of the animatronics appears to result from the possession by the vengeful souls of children who were killed at the restaurant. The player is guided by the previous night guard, known as Phone Guy, who assists them in their defense against the animatronics. Mike is fired from his job after the seventh night for "tampering with the animatronics, body odor and general unprofessionalism".

Five Nights at Freddy's 2 (2014)

Shortly after the release of the first game, Cawthon confirmed rumors about a sequel. He posted a teaser of the sequel on his website one month after the original game's release and continued to post teasers until the sequel's release. A trailer was released on October 21, 2014, introducing new animatronic characters and the absence of doors. Five Nights at Freddy's 2 was released for Microsoft Windows on November 10, 2014, earlier than its planned release of December 25. Ports for Android and iOS were released on November 13 and 20 of 2014 respectively. A Windows Phone port was also released, but was withdrawn for substandard graphics. PlayStation 4, Xbox One, and Nintendo Switch console ports were released on November 29, 2019.

The gameplay is largely similar to its predecessor. Players must survive a night shift at the "new and improved" Freddy Fazbear's Pizza restaurant from 12 a.m. to 6 a.m., without being attacked by any of the animatronics that wander from room to room. In addition to the animatronics from the first game (which are depicted in a deteriorated state), the game features several new antagonists, who can be fended off using different tactics. The explanation given for the animatronics' behavior during the game is similar to the one from the first Five Nights at Freddy's. The protagonist is a new character, Jeremy Fitzgerald, who is promoted to daytime security after the sixth night, being replaced by Fritz Smith in the "custom night". During the game, Phone Guy from the previous game calls Jeremy to give him hints on how to survive each night while talking about the restaurant's history. During these calls, it is revealed that the restaurant has become the subject of a police investigation due to various rumors. It is also possible to access hidden Atari-styled minigames that provide further insight on the restaurant's troubled past, showing a purple figure killing multiple children. On the fifth night, the location is put on lockdown due to an unspecified event. At the end of the game, Jeremy receives a paycheck dated 1987 (thus revealing that the events of the game take place before the first Five Nights at Freddy's), and the restaurant is closed, with a new location set to be opened elsewhere.

Five Nights at Freddy's 3 (2015)

On January 3, 2015, an image was uploaded to Cawthon's website teasing a third entry in the series. Other images followed before a trailer was released on January 26, 2015. On February 15, Cawthon posted on Steam that Five Nights at Freddy's 3 was cancelled after a hacker allegedly leaked the game. This was later revealed as a hoax; the "leaked" download linked to a humorous clone of a previous game of Cawthon's, There is No Pause Button!, in which the main character is depicted wearing the Freddy animatronic head. Five Nights at Freddy's 3 was released for Microsoft Windows on March 3, 2015, with Android and iOS ports following on March 7 and 12, respectively. PlayStation 4, Xbox One, and Nintendo Switch console ports were released on November 29, 2019.

Set thirty years after the events of the first game, its main character works at Fazbear's Fright, a horror attraction based on the long-gone Freddy Fazbear's Pizza. The player must defend themselves from the deteriorated animatronic-costume hybrid named Springtrap. Burnt and tattered hallucinations of some of the animatronics from the previous two games appear; and although they cannot kill the player, they can hinder ventilation, sound, and camera systems. Failure to maintain the systems can create many issues for the player, including dysfunctional cameras and the inability to play audio to lure away the animatronic. The player receives guidance from a founder of the horror attraction for the first two nights and listens to old tape recordings which were found by the attraction's workers for the rest of the nights. The game has two endings: a "good" ending and a "bad" ending. The bad ending reveals that the souls of the murdered children still haunt the animatronics. The good ending is reached by completing secret minigames in which animatronic characters bring a cake to what seems to be a sorrowful child's soul. After completing the secret minigames, the souls of the children are freed.

Five Nights at Freddy's 4 (2015)

On April 27, 2015, Cawthon began posting images on his website teasing another game in the series, which was originally titled Five Nights at Freddy's: The Final Chapter. A trailer was released on July 13, 2015, hinting that the game was set in the main character's house. Five Nights at Freddy's 4 was announced with a release date of October 31, 2015. It was pushed forward to August 8 and again to July 23, when the game was unexpectedly released on Microsoft Windows through Steam. Android and iOS ports were released on July 25 and August 3, 2015, respectively. PlayStation 4, Xbox One, and Nintendo Switch console ports were released on November 29, 2019.

The player character is an unknown and unnamed character who has delusions of being attacked by nightmarish versions of the first game's animatronic characters. The player must defend theirself with a flashlight and doors. The game's story is told through minigames, in which an unnamed young boy is bullied because of his irrational fear of a restaurant with a yellow animatronic bear and rabbit called Fredbear and Spring Bonnie, respectively. He is guided by an animatronic plush toy, who speaks to the character when he is alone. The child is eventually killed by Fredbear in a freak accident. The game had a Halloween update with "nightmare" versions of animatronics from Five Nights at Freddy's 2 and Halloween-themed reskins for Nightmare Bonnie and Nightmare Chica.

Five Nights at Freddy's: Sister Location (2016)

On April 23, 2016, Cawthon posted a teaser image on his website of a clown-like animatronic named Baby from an upcoming game titled Sister Location. Several teaser images of different characters and hints at their origins followed. The trailer for the game was released on Cawthon's YouTube channel, with new animatronics and a new location. The release date was announced as October 7, 2016. Cawthon made a prank release of the game on October 5, apparently releasing a "mature" edition after a decision to delay the game to make it more kid-friendly. The download link led to a clone of Cawthon's previous game, Sit 'N Survive. Sister Location was released for Microsoft Windows on October 7, 2016, followed by ports for Android on December 22, 2016, and iOS on January 3, 2017, respectively. It was also released on Nintendo Switch in North America on June 18, 2020, and on Xbox One on July 10, 2020. The PlayStation 4 port was released in Europe and North America on July 21 and July 22, 2020, respectively.

The player character Michael Afton, nicknamed Mike (jokingly called Eggs Benedict), is a new employee of Circus Baby's Rentals and Entertainment (a sister company of Fazbear Entertainment that rents animatronics for children's parties). The animatronics were originally intended for Circus Baby's Pizza World, which never opened due to a gas leak. Mike is guided by HandUnit, an AI character similar to the Phone Guy of previous games. HandUnit instructs him about his job, often telling him to disregard safety; the animatronic Baby often gives instructions that contradict HandUnit's, but are vital to survival.

The game also has a "custom night", in which the player can use mechanics reminiscent of the first game (such as interactive doors and a camera system) which were absent from the main game. New minigames are also available, describing the fate of Mike after the events of the main game. A cutscene is shown after the "Golden Freddy" custom-night preset, in which Michael speaks to his father, William Afton / Springtrap, in a foreboding way.

Freddy Fazbear's Pizzeria Simulator (2017)

In June 2017, Cawthon hinted at the development of a sixth main game in the series. On July 2, 2017, he announced his decision to cancel the game and said that he had been "neglecting other things in [his] life for the sake of trying to keep up with mounting expectations". On December 4, 2017, after teasing the game several days earlier, Cawthon released Freddy Fazbear's Pizzeria Simulator as freeware on Steam. The game is a business-simulation game in which the player runs a pizzeria, but frequently shifts into the survival-horror vein of the series' other games.

The game's story again follows Michael Afton who, sometime following the events of Five Nights at Freddy's 3 and Sister Location, becomes the manager of a new Freddy Fazbear's restaurant run by the mysterious "Cassette Man". Every night, Michael, under Cassette Man's guidance, must salvage one of four decrepit animatronics that were found in the restaurant's back alley, including his father William / Springtrap (now referred to as "Scraptrap") and his sister Elizabeth / Circus Baby (referred to as "Scrap Baby"). The game has multiple endings depending on how well the player runs the pizzeria and whether they salvaged all the animatronics, but the canon ending has Cassette Man reveal himself as Henry Emily, William's former business partner and the father of Charlotte (the spirit possessing the Puppet animatronic), and set the restaurant on fire after revealing its true purpose as a trap to lure in the remaining animatronics. The restaurant burns to the ground, seemingly killing Michael, Henry, and all the animatronics, finally releasing the spirits haunting them.

Five Nights at Freddy's: Help Wanted (2019)

On August 18, 2018, Cawthon confirmed on his Steam thread that the next main installment in the Five Nights at Freddy's series would be available as a virtual reality game. On March 25, 2019, during Sony Interactive Entertainment's State of Play live stream announcing several new games for the PlayStation 4, a trailer announcing the game was shown. In the game, the player is a technician repairing a pizzeria's animatronics. From a first-person perspective, they fix the animatronics, solve puzzles and navigate dark hallways while avoiding malfunctioning and hostile animatronics. The game was released on May 28, 2019. A non-VR version of the game was released on December 17, 2019, for Microsoft Windows and PlayStation 4.Curse of Dreadbear, a Halloween-themed downloadable content pack for Help Wanted was released in three parts, with several "waves" of new minigames released on October 23, October 29, and October 31, 2019, for a total of 10 new minigames. The DLC pack includes new animatronic characters, returning animatronics from previous games, and a Halloween-themed hub. Some of the new stages are re-skinned versions of existent minigames, such as a version of the FNAF 1 minigames called Danger! Keep Out! Notable new game modes include a shooting gallery, a free-roaming corn maze, and an assembly line in which the player must construct an animatronic.

Five Nights at Freddy's: Security Breach (2021)

On August 8, 2019, on the first game's fifth anniversary, Cawthon posted a new image on his website, teasing the next installment for the series. It shows the "Mega Pizzaplex", a large shopping mall containing a laser tag arena, an arcade, a cinema and a Freddy Fazbear's Pizza restaurant; in the main square, '80s-style versions of Freddy, Chica, and four completely new animatronics can be seen playing for an excited crowd. On April 21, 2020, the characters' names were leaked from Funko's list of upcoming products, and the title was revealed as Five Nights at Freddy's: Pizza Plex. Scott Cawthon confirmed the leaks via Reddit but revealed that the title was not official. The game was initially scheduled for an early 2021 release, but was delayed to late 2021.Security Breach was released on PlayStation 5, PlayStation 4 and Steam on December 16, 2021. The game's plot revolves around a young boy named Gregory being trapped in a large shopping mall teeming with murderous animatronics who hunt him down by the orders of Vanny, a mysterious woman in a rabbit costume, while also evading the mall's security guard, Vanessa. Suffering a malfunction that causes him to ignore Vanny's hacking, Freddy assists Gregory in escaping the mall.

Spin-offs
FNaF World (2016)

Cawthon announced a spin-off from his series, FNaF World, on September 15, 2015. Unlike the main series, the game is a role-playing video game using the first four games' animatronic characters. The game is set in a fanciful world where the characters must fight enemies and progress by unlocking perks and items. Originally planned for release on February 2, 2016, Cawthon rescheduled the release for January 22 and released it on January 1.

Players and critics criticized the game for missing key features and being unstable and unfinished, for which Cawthon apologized: "I got too eager to show the things that were finished that I neglected to pay attention to the things that weren't." He decided to remove it from Steam, saying that the game would be improved and later re-released free of charge. Cawthon announced that he asked Valve to refund all purchasers the price of the game.

He released a free version of the game, featuring a 3D overworld and an updated character-selection screen, in February 2016. Cawthon posted a new teaser the following month, with characters such as the main series' Purple Guy and most of the characters from the Halloween update of Five Nights at Freddy's 4. He created minigames for the game's second update, including Foxy Fighters, FOXY.exe, Chica's Magic Rainbow, and FNaF 57: Freddy In Space.

Ultimate Custom Night (2018)Ultimate Custom Night was originally intended to be a post-launch add-on to Pizzeria Simulator, but was eventually turned into a stand-alone game, releasing on June 27, 2018. The customizable night contains a total of fifty animatronics from previous games, which allows the player to determine how aggressive they are during the night (similar to the custom nights in earlier games). The player can select the office to play in and has 16 themed game modes available. Although unconfirmed, it has been heavily speculated that the game takes place in some version of Hell or Purgatory, where William Afton, following his death in Pizzeria Simulator, is being continuously tortured by the vengeful spirit of one of his vicitms.

However, the anthology novel series Fazbear Frights implies that the game is actually Afton's repeating nightmare, and not hell or purgatory. This comes from the fifth book, Bunny Call, which has a story called "The Man in Room 1280" where a burned man is kept alive by a shadow child despite the fact that he should be dead and suffers nightmares. In the following book, Blackbird, the epilogue confirms that the man is actually William Afton. Although it was never confirmed if the Fazbear Frights series is canon or not, Cawthon confirmed that it's supposed to reveal mysteries from the previous games.

Five Nights at Freddy's: Special Delivery (2019)

An augmented reality game, Five Nights at Freddy's: Special Delivery, was announced on September 13, 2019. The game was released for free on iOS and Android on November 25, 2019.Dark Circus: Encore!, downloadable content for Special Delivery, was released on December 13, 2021 and has the player sent into a mixed-reality environment where they can freely move around the area by tapping on their screen to move forward. The player is tasked with solving puzzles while on a time limit. Machines with clocks ticking down are strewn throughout the circus, with the players having to search around for clues to solve them. As more tasks are completed, the chained up animatronics are slowly unbound, leading to battles against them in the traditional AR playstyle.

Freddy in Space 2 (2019)Freddy in Space 2 is a side-scrolling platform shooter game and a sequel to the FNaF 57: Freddy in Space minigame from FNaF World. It was released for free on December 3, 2019, on Game Jolt. The game was made to promote a "#CancelCancer" charity livestream on YouTube, which was hosted by Matthew Patrick of Game Theory for St. Jude Children's Research Hospital in Memphis, Tennessee.

Security Breach: Fury's Rage (2021)Security Breach: Fury's Rage is a side-scrolling beat 'em up game featuring the main cast of Security Breach. It was released for free on April 28, 2021, on Game Jolt. The game was made to compensate for Security Breach being delayed for a second time.

Youtooz Presents: Five Nights at Freddy's (2022)Youtooz Presents: Five Nights at Freddy's is an augmented reality mobile game released on April 29, 2022, by Youtooz on Augmio, to promote the Five Nights at Freddy's: Security Breach Youtooz toy line.

Fazbear Fanverse

On August 21, 2020, Cawthon announced his plan to help fund and publish Five Nights at Freddy's games developed by fans, bundled with previous installments in their respective series. He will not be involved in any of the creative elements but will help with marketing and publishing support, as well as appropriate licensing. The games included will be the One Night at Flumpty's series, the Five Nights at Candy's series, The Joy of Creation: Ignited Collection (consisting of the original The Joy of Creation, The Joy of Creation: Reborn and The Joy of Creation: Story Mode), POPGOES Evergreen (including the prologue game POPGOES Arcade), and Five Nights at Freddy's Plus, a remake/re-imagining of the original game. Cawthon also stated that these games will come to mobile and consoles, and may even have merchandise created for them. The first game to be released under this initiative was a port of One Night at Flumpty's for Android and iOS on October 31 and November 18, 2020, respectively. The second game to be released was a port of its sequel One Night at Flumpty's 2 on January 20, 2021, again for Android and iOS.

The first new game to be released as a part of this initiative was One Night at Flumpty's 3 on October 31, 2021, for PC and mobile devices, and for consoles at a later date.

One Night at Flumpty's series (2015–2021)One Night at Flumpty's is a Five Nights at Freddy's parody series developed by Jonochrome, endorsed by Scott Cawthon. The first game, One Night at Flumpty's, was initially released on January 28, 2015, with the second game, One Night at Flumpty's 2, being released on April 11, 2015. On August 22, 2020, the first two games were re-released. The first game in the series to be released under the Fazbear Fanverse was a port of One Night at Flumpty's for Android and iOS on October 31 and November 18, 2020, respectively. The second game to be released was a port of its sequel One Night at Flumpty's 2 on January 20, 2021, again for Android and iOS. The third and final game, One Night at Flumpty's 3, was released on October 31, 2021, for PC and mobile devices. A bundle for consoles that includes the three main games, titled One Night at Flumpty's: The Egg Collection, is currently in development.

Five Nights at Candy's series (2015–present)Five Nights at Candy's is a spin-off series developed by Emil Macko. It has been officially endorsed and funded by Scott Cawthon. The series is about a restaurant called Candy's Burgers & Fries, meant to rival Freddy Fazbear's Pizza, and has dark secrets of its own. The first game, Five Nights at Candy's, was released on July 18, 2015. The second game, Five Nights at Candy's 2, was released on February 28, 2016, followed by the third game, Five Nights at Candy's 3 on March 3, 2017. On August 14, 2019, the first game was remastered for the fourth anniversary of the series. Under the Fazbear Fanverse, the fourth and final game is currently in development, alongside ports for the previous three games to consoles and mobile.

The Joy of Creation series (2015–present)
Developed by Nikson, The Joy of Creation is a series of games made in Unreal Engine 4. They've been officially endorsed and funded by Scott Cawthon. The first game, The Joy of Creation, was initially released on November 30, 2015. The project was cancelled and then revived as The Joy of Creation: Reborn on May 15, 2016, followed by a Halloween edition of The Joy of Creation on October 31, 2016, and The Joy of Creation: Story Mode on July 18, 2017. Under the Fazbear Fanverse, a bundle that includes Unreal Engine 5 remakes of the three main games, titled The Joy of Creation: Ignited Collection, is currently in development.

POPGOES series (2016–present)POPGOES is a spin-off series developed by Kane Carter. Initially a fan-project, it is now endorsed, licensed, and funded by Scott Cawthon. It takes place in an alternate universe that only takes the first three entries of the Five Nights at Freddy's series into account. The series was also confirmed to also take place in the same universe as Five Nights at Candy's. The first release in the series was an interactive teaser titled POPGOES Arcade, released on April 1, 2016. The first main game, titled POPGOES, was released on June 26, 2016, followed by the second interactive teaser POPGOES Arcade 2 on April 8, 2017. POPGOES Reprinted was a project that included a remake and a sequel to POPGOES was planned to be released in 2018, but was cancelled on November 28, 2017. The series was then rebooted with POPGOES Arcade on June 12, 2020. Under the Fazbear Fanverse, an expansion was added for POPGOES Arcade titled POPGOES and The Machinist, as well as a new full game titled POPGOES Evergreen. A bundle including the rebooted titles are presumed to be in development for mobile and consoles as well. POPGOES Arcade, alongside its POPGOES and The Machinist expansion was released on July 1, 2022, on Steam, for $4.99.

Five Nights at Freddy's Plus (TBA)Five Nights at Freddy's Plus is an upcoming officially licensed reimagining of the first Five Nights at Freddy's game developed by Phil Morg, also known as Phisnom. It is not canon to the main Five Nights at Freddy's continuity, and takes place in an alternate universe, with a new interpretation of the original game's plot.

Music

Ambient music for the first four Five Nights at Freddy's games is primarily stock music adapted by Cawthon. Songs includes the "Toreador Song" when the player runs out of power in Five Nights at Freddy's and "My Grandfather's Clock", played by the Puppet's music box as it winds down in Five Nights at Freddy's 2. Sister Location, Pizzeria Simulator, Ultimate Custom Night, Help Wanted, and Special Delivery have original soundtracks composed by Leon Riskin. The soundtrack for Security Breach was composed by Allen Simpson with Leon Riskin credited with "additional music composition" and Gordon McGladdery credited with "additional music".

 Books 

 Novel trilogy Five Nights at Freddy's: The Silver Eyes (2015)Five Nights at Freddy's: The Silver Eyes is the first novel by Scott Cawthon and Kira Breed-Wrisley. It was published ahead of schedule on Kindle on December 27, 2015, and a paperback release followed on September 27, 2016. The novel follows a group of childhood friends who meet in their hometown and discover unnerving secrets about the once-beloved Freddy Fazbear's Pizza. According to Cawthon, the novel "expands the mythos and reveals a human element never before seen in the games". Although the novel inhabits the Five Nights at Freddy's universe, the book and the games are not "intended to fit together like two puzzle pieces".Five Nights at Freddy's: The Twisted Ones (2017)Five Nights at Freddy's: The Twisted Ones, the second novel by Cawthon and Breed-Wrisley, is a sequel to Five Nights at Freddy's: The Silver Eyes which was discovered on Amazon under Cawthon's name on January 8, 2017. Although the discovery sparked controversy about the book's legitimacy, Cawthon soon confirmed that it was an official publication. The novel, published on June 27, 2017, involves Charlie, the main character from The Silver Eyes, who is "drawn back into the world of her father's frightening creations" while trying to move on.Five Nights at Freddy's: The Fourth Closet (2018)Five Nights at Freddy's: The Fourth Closet, the third novel by Cawthon and Breed-Wrisley, was published on June 26, 2018. The novel focuses on Charlie's friends, who are searching for the truth behind what happened to Charlie in The Twisted Ones while mysterious events unfold after a new restaurant opens.

 Fazbear Frights series Five Nights at Freddy's: Fazbear Frights #1: Into the Pit (2019)Fazbear Frights #1: Into the Pit is the first book in the Fazbear Frights series, a series of short stories compilations, and was co-written by Elley Cooper with Cawthon. It was released on December 26, 2019, and contains three short stories: "Into the Pit", "To Be Beautiful", and "Count the Ways". "Into the Pit" is about a child named Oswald. He has no friends and finds himself being bored during the summer. He soon discovers something at a nearby pizzeria. "To Be Beautiful" is about a kid named Sarah, who wishes to be beautiful and finds an animatronic who can help her with that. "Count the Ways" is about a teenager named Millie, who accidentally gets trapped inside Funtime Freddy's body, and wishes to disappear off the earth.Five Nights at Freddy's: Fazbear Frights #2: Fetch (2020)Fazbear Frights #2: Fetch is the second book in the Fazbear Frights series and was co-written by Andrea Waggener and Carly Anne West with Cawthon. It was released on March 3, 2020, and contains three short stories: "Fetch", "Lonely Freddy", and "Out of Stock". "Fetch" tells about a high schooler named Greg, who finds a strange animatronic, Fetch, in an abandoned Freddy Fazbear's Pizza, and decides to test some science he's been studying. "Lonely Freddy" shows a teenager named Alec trying to expose his sister as a brat while celebrating her birthday at Freddy Fazbear's Pizza. "Out of Stock" is about a high schooler named Oscar, who gets a Plushtrap toy, but later understands its true colors.Five Nights at Freddy's: Fazbear Frights #3: 1:35AM (2020)Fazbear Frights #3: 1:35AM is the third book in the Fazbear Frights series and was co-written by Cooper and Waggener with Cawthon. It was released on May 5, 2020, and contains three short stories: "1:35 A.M.", "Room for One More", and "The New Kid". "1:35 A.M." shows a recently divorced woman Delilah buying an Ella doll and using her as an alarm, but later throws her out, but is still tormented by the alarm. "Room for One More" is about a young man Stanley, working at Circus Baby's Entertainment and Rental. "The New Kid" is about Devon and his friend Mick, trying to teach the new kid a lesson as he tries to take his popularity.Five Nights at Freddy's: Fazbear Frights #4: Step Closer (2020)Fazbear Frights #4: Step Closer is the fourth book in the Fazbear Frights series and was co-written by Cooper, Kelly Parra, and Waggener with Cawthon. It was released on July 7, 2020, and contains three short stories: "Step Closer", "Dance with Me", and "Coming Home". "Step Closer" follows Pete, trying to scare his younger brother with Foxy. "Dance with Me" shows Kasey, a thief, who, after stealing a pair of cardboard goggles, starts seeing Ballora. "Coming Home" is about Samantha, trying to help her dead sister, Susie.Five Nights at Freddy's: Fazbear Frights #5: Bunny Call (2020)Fazbear Frights #5: Bunny Call is the fifth volume of the Fazbear Frights series and was co-written by Cooper and Waggener with Cawthon. It was released on September 1, 2020, and contains three short stories: "Bunny Call", "In the Flesh", and "The Man in Room 1280". "Bunny Call" includes a man named Bob, who orders for a Bunny Call to prank his family. "In the Flesh" follows a game developer named Matt, whose character he programmed starts to act strangely. "The Man in Room 1280" is about a priest named Arthur who visits a man in a hospital who is supposed to be dead, but lives.Five Nights at Freddy's: Fazbear Frights #6: Blackbird (2020)Fazbear Frights #6: Blackbird is the sixth volume of the Fazbear Frights series and was co-written by Parra and Waggener with Cawthon. It was released on December 29, 2020, and contains three short stories: "Blackbird", "The Real Jake", and "Hide-and-Seek". "Blackbird" features a man named Nole, who is tormented for his actions in the past. "The Real Jake" centers around the titular Jake, a dying child who finds solace in an animatronic made by his parents. "Hide-and-Seek" follows Toby, who accidentally unleashes a malevolent entity from an arcade game.Five Nights at Freddy's: Fazbear Frights #7: The Cliffs (2021)Fazbear Frights #7: The Cliffs is the seventh volume of the Fazbear Frights series and was co-written by Cooper and Waggener with Cawthon. It was released on March 2, 2021, and contains three short stories: "The Cliffs", "The Breaking Wheel", and "He Told Me Everything". "The Cliffs" is about a single father named Robert. "The Breaking Wheel" is about a boy named Reed trying to stand up to his school's bully. "He Told Me Everything" is about a child named Chris joining the school's science club.Five Nights at Freddy's: Fazbear Frights #8: Gumdrop Angel (2021)Fazbear Frights #8: Gumdrop Angel is the eighth volume of the Fazbear Frights series and was co-written by Waggener with Cawthon. It was released on May 4, 2021, and contains three short stories: "Gumdrop Angel", "Sergio's Lucky Day", and "What We Found". "Gumdrop Angel" is about a girl named Angel taking revenge on her spoiled sister. "Sergio's Lucky Day" is about a man named Sergio getting a new toy. "What We Found" is about a man named Hudson getting a new security job.Five Nights at Freddy's: Fazbear Frights #9: The Puppet Carver (2021)Fazbear Frights #9: The Puppet Carver is the ninth volume of the Fazbear Frights series and was co-written by Cooper with Cawthon. It was released on July 6, 2021, and contains three short stories: "The Puppet Carver", "Jump for Tickets", and "Pizza Kit". "The Puppet Carver" is about a man named Jack trying to run a pizzeria. "Jump for Tickets" is about a boy named Colton rewiring a machine. "Pizza Kit" is about a girl named Payton grieving the loss of her friend.Five Nights at Freddy's: Fazbear Frights #10: Friendly Face (2021)Fazbear Frights #10: Friendly Face is the tenth volume of the Fazbear Frights series and was co-written by Waggener with Cawthon. It was released on September 7, 2021, and contains three short stories: "Friendly Face", "Sea Bonnies", and "Together Forever". "Friendly Face" is about a boy named Edward getting an animatronic based on his deceased cat. "Sea Bonnies" is about a boy named Mott who flushes his brother's new pets down the toilet. "Together Forever" is about a girl named Jessica reprogramming a defunct animatronic.Five Nights at Freddy's: Fazbear Frights #11: Prankster (2021)Fazbear Frights #11: Prankster is the eleventh and final volume of the Fazbear Frights series and was co-written by Cooper and Waggener with Cawthon. It was released on November 2, 2021, and contains three short stories: "Prankster", "Kids at Play", and "Find Player Two!". "Prankster" is about a man named Jeremiah who gets pranked by his coworkers. "Kids at Play" is about a boy named Joel who hits and runs a kid with his truck. "Find Player Two!" is about a girl named Aimee who is guilt-ridden about her friend's disappearance.Five Nights at Freddy's: Fazbear Frights #12: Felix the Shark (2022)Fazbear Frights #12: Felix the Shark is the twelfth and bonus volume of the Fazbear Frights series and was co-written by Cooper, Parra, and Waggener with Cawthon. It was released on April 19, 2022, and contains three short stories: "Felix the Shark", "The Scoop", and "You're the Band". "Felix the Shark" is about a man named Dirk who is looking for an animatronic from his childhood. "The Scoop" is about a girl named Mandy who finds a strange image in the files of a game. "You're the Band" is about a woman named Sylvia who buys her son a Freddy Fazbear mask.

 Tales from the Pizzaplex series Five Nights at Freddy's: Tales from the Pizzaplex #1: Lally's Game (2022)Tales from the Pizzaplex #1: Lally's Game is the first volume of the Tales from the Pizzaplex series, another series of short stories compilations, and was co-written by Parra and Waggener with Cawthon. It was released on July 19, 2022, and contains three short stories: "Frailty", "Lally's Game", and "Under Construction". "Frailty" is about a hospital worker named Jessica, who leads a double life. "Lally's Game" is about a woman named Selena and an artifact from her fiancé's past. "Under Construction" follows a teen named Maya who explores an area of Freddy Fazbear's Mega Pizzaplex that is under construction.Five Nights at Freddy's: Tales from the Pizzaplex #2: HAPPS (2022)Tales from the Pizzaplex #2: HAPPS is the second volume of the Tales from the Pizzaplex series and was co-written by Cooper and Waggener with Cawthon. It was released on August 30, 2022, and contains three short stories: "Help Wanted", "HAPPS", and "B-7". "Help Wanted" follows a janitor named Steve, who dreams of becoming a video game programmer, which leads him to a job that is too good to be true. "HAPPS" is about two teens, who scare kids in the tube maze of Freddy Fazbear's Mega Pizzaplex. "B-7" is about a child, who believes he is really an animatronic.Five Nights at Freddy's: Tales from the Pizzaplex #3: Somniphobia (2022)Tales from the Pizzaplex #3: Somniphobia is the third volume of the Tales from the Pizzaplex series and was co-written by Parra and Waggener with Cawthon. It was released on December 6, 2022, and contains three short stories: "Somniphobia", "Pressure", and "Cleithrophobia". "Somniphobia" is about a high-schooler named Sam, who is afraid of things that are unhealthy since his father passed away. "Pressure" is about a teen named Luca and a Springtrap costume that sends chills to his core. "Cleithrophobia" follows a Pizzaplex technician named Grady and his fear of being trapped in small spaces.Five Nights at Freddy's: Tales from the Pizzaplex #4: Submechanophobia (2022)Tales from the Pizzaplex #4: Submechanophobia is the fourth volume of the Tales from the Pizzaplex series and was co-written by Parra and Waggener with Cawthon. It was released on December 27, 2022, and contains three short stories: "Submechanophobia", "Animatronic Apocalypse", and "Bobbiedots, Part 1". "Submechanophobia" follows a technician for Freddy's Fantasy Water Park, who has the fear of underwater man-made objects. "Animatronic Apocalypse" is about a kid named Robbie, who is a member of his school's Fazbear Fan Club, and believes the other members' minds have been taken over. "Bobbiedots, Part 1" is the first part of a story about a Pizzaplex security guard named Abe, who believes that the animatronic assistants at the Fazplex Tower apartment are hiding things.Five Nights at Freddy's: Tales from the Pizzaplex #5: The Bobbiedots Conclusion (2023)Tales from the Pizzaplex #5: The Bobbiedots Conclusion is the fifth volume of the Tales from the Pizzaplex series and was co-written by Waggener with Cawthon. It was released on March 7, 2023, and contains three short stories: "GGY", "The Storyteller", and "Bobbiedots, Part 2". "GGY" follows a kid named Tony and his search for the player behind the impossibly high scores of the Pizzaplex Fazcade. "The Storyteller" is about what happens when the Fazbear Entertainment board of directors outsource their storytelling to artificial intelligence. "Bobbiedots, Part 2" continues the story of Abe and his journey to find the cause of problems at the Fazplex Tower apartment.Five Nights at Freddy's: Tales from the Pizzaplex #6: Nexie (2023)Tales from the Pizzaplex #6: Nexie is the upcoming sixth volume of the Tales from the Pizzaplex series and will be co-written by Parra and Waggener with Cawthon. It will be released on May 2, 2023.Five Nights at Freddy's: Tales from the Pizzaplex #7: Tiger Rock (2023)Tales from the Pizzaplex #7: Tiger Rock is the upcoming seventh volume of the Tales from the Pizzaplex series and will be co-written by Parra and Waggener with Cawthon. It will be released on July 4, 2023.Five Nights at Freddy's: Tales from the Pizzaplex #8: B7-2 (2023)Tales from the Pizzaplex #8: B7-2 is the upcoming eighth volume of the Tales from the Pizzaplex series. It will be released on October 3, 2023.Five Nights at Freddy's: Tales from the Pizzaplex #9 (2024)Tales from the Pizzaplex #9 is the upcoming ninth volume of the Tales from the Pizzaplex series. It will be released in January 2024.

 Graphic novels Five Nights at Freddy's: The Silver Eyes: The Graphic Novel (2019)Five Nights at Freddy's: The Silver Eyes: The Graphic Novel is a graphic novel adaptation of Five Nights at Freddy's: The Silver Eyes that was published on December 26, 2019, and was adapted and illustrated by Claudia Schröder (also known as PinkyPills).Five Nights at Freddy's: The Twisted Ones: The Graphic Novel (2021)Five Nights at Freddy's: The Twisted Ones: The Graphic Novel is a graphic novel adaptation of Five Nights at Freddy's: The Twisted Ones that was published on February 2, 2021, and was adapted by Christopher Hastings and illustrated by Claudia Aguirre.Five Nights at Freddy's: The Fourth Closet: The Graphic Novel (2021)Five Nights at Freddy's: The Fourth Closet: The Graphic Novel is a graphic novel adaptation of Five Nights at Freddy's: The Fourth Closet that was published on December 28, 2021, and was adapted by Hastings and illustrated by Diana Camero.Five Nights at Freddy's: Fazbear Frights: Graphic Novel Collection #1 (2022)Five Nights at Freddy's: Fazbear Frights: Graphic Novel Collection #1 is the first graphic novel adaptation of the Fazbear Frights series and was adapted by Hastings and illustrated by Didi Esmeralda, Anthony Morris Jr., and Andi Santagata. It was released on September 6, 2022, and features the stories "Into the Pit" and "To Be Beautiful" from Fazbear Frights #1: Into the Pit and "Out of Stock" from Fazbear Frights #2: Fetch.Five Nights at Freddy's: Fazbear Frights: Graphic Novel Collection #2 (2023)Five Nights at Freddy's: Fazbear Frights: Graphic Novel Collection #2 is the second graphic novel adaptation of the Fazbear Frights series and was adapted by Hastings and illustrated by Esmeralda, Coryn MacPherson, and Morris. It was released on March 7, 2023, and features the stories "Fetch" from Fazbear Frights #2: Fetch and "Room for One More" and "The New Kid" from Fazbear Frights #3: 1:35AM.Five Nights at Freddy's: Fazbear Frights: Graphic Novel Collection #3 (2023)Five Nights at Freddy's: Fazbear Frights: Graphic Novel Collection #3 is the third upcoming graphic novel adaptation of the Fazbear Frights series and will be adapted by Hastings and illustrated by Camero, Esmeralda, and MacPherson. It will be released on September 5, 2023, and features the stories "Step Closer" from Fazbear Frights #4: Step Closer, "Bunny Call" from Fazbear Frights #5: Bunny Call, and "Hide-and-Seek" from Fazbear Frights #6: Blackbird.Five Nights at Freddy's: Fazbear Frights: Graphic Novel Collection #4 (2024)Five Nights at Freddy's: Fazbear Frights: Graphic Novel Collection #4 is the fourth upcoming graphic novel adaptation of the Fazbear Frights series and will be adapted by Hastings. It will be released in January 2024.Five Nights at Freddy's: Fazbear Frights: Graphic Novel Collection #5 (2024)Five Nights at Freddy's: Fazbear Frights: Graphic Novel Collection #5 is the fifth upcoming graphic novel adaptation of the Fazbear Frights series and will be adapted by Hastings. It will be released in September 2024.

 Film adaptation 

Warner Bros. Pictures announced in April 2015 that it had acquired the series' film rights, with Roy Lee, David Katzenberg, and Seth Grahame-Smith scheduled to produce. Grahame-Smith said that they would collaborate with Cawthon "to make an insane, terrifying and weirdly adorable movie". In July 2015, Gil Kenan signed to direct the adaptation and co-write it with Tyler Burton Smith.

In January 2017, Cawthon said that due to "problems within the movie industry as a whole", the film "was met with several delays and roadblocks" and was "back at square one". He promised "to be involved with the movie from day one this time, and that's something extremely important to me. I want this movie to be something that I'm excited for the fanbase to see." Cawthon tweeted a picture of Blumhouse Productions in March of that year, implying that the film had a new production company. Producer Jason Blum confirmed the news two months later, saying that he was excited about working closely with Cawthon on the adaptation. In June 2017, Kenan said that he was no longer directing the film after Warner Bros. Pictures' turnaround. It was announced in February 2018 that Chris Columbus would direct and write the film, also producing it with Blum and Cawthon. In August 2018, Cawthon announced that the script's first draft (involving the events of the first game) was completed and a second and third film were possible. Later that month, Blum tweeted that the film was planned for a 2020 release. However, a few months later, in November 2018, Cawthon announced that the film's script had been scrapped and it would be further delayed.

After almost two years without any subsequent announcements, Blum confirmed in June 2020 that the movie was still in active development, which he reiterated in November 2020. On November 20, Cawthon announced in a Reddit post discussing the many scrapped screenplays for the film that filming for the movie, referring to its script as the "Mike" screenplay, would begin in spring 2021. However, Blum revealed in September 2021 that the film still had script issues and that Columbus was no longer attached to the project as director. In March 2022, Blum stated that news on the film is "dangerously close" and that it could release in 2023.

On August 9, 2022, Jason Blum announced on Twitter, "It's great to be working with Jim Henson's Creature Shop. Their experience and expertise with animatronics is absolutely killer! @blumhouse." The photo that was used in the tweet showed a Creature Shop worker constructing a Freddy Fazbear model. On October 5, Blum officially announced on Twitter that Jim Henson's Creature Shop is working on the animatronics for the film, the director will be Emma Tammi, and filming will commence in February 2023 in New Orleans. It was also announced that the film's script had been written by Cawthon, Tammi, and Seth Cuddeback and will be produced by Blumhouse in association with Striker Entertainment, with Cawthon and Blum as producers and Russell Binder as executive producer. That December, Matthew Lillard and Josh Hutcherson were reportedly cast as William Afton and Mike Schmidt, respectively, alongside Piper Rubio as Mike's younger sister and Mary Stuart Masterson as an unnamed villain.

In February 2023, it was confirmed that Universal Pictures—which has a first-look deal with Blumhouse—will distribute the film.

 Reception 

The original Five Nights at Freddy's received "generally favorable" reviews according to review aggregator website Metacritic, assigning the Windows version a score of 78 out of 100. Indie Game Magazine praised the game for its simple take on the horror genre, labeling the game a "fantastic example of how cleverness in design and subtlety can be used to make an experience terrifying". They noted that its artistic direction and gameplay mechanics contributed to a feeling of "brutal tension", but criticized it for taking too long to load when launched. Omri Petitte for PC Gamer gave Five Nights at Freddy's a score of 80 out of 100, commenting that the game took a "less-is-more" approach to its design, and praising the overall atmosphere for emphasizing the fear and suspense of an approaching threat, rather than the arrival of the threat itself as in other horror-oriented games. However, the gameplay was criticized for becoming repetitive once a player masters it, noting players have "not much more to expect beyond managing battery life and careful timing of slamming doors shut." Ryan Bates of Game Revolution gave the game a 4.5 out of 5, commending the game's minimalistic presentation (particularly its audio design and lack of music) for contributing to the terror of the game, along with its repetitive gameplay that would "[reach] almost OCD-type levels, adding to the tense environment." He opined that the game was "horror done right", but felt it was too short. Shaun Musgrave of TouchArcade gave a rating of 3.5 out of 5, noting the game's reliance on atmosphere to induce fear, opining that "if the atmosphere doesn't get to you, all that's left is a very simple game of red light-green light." Eurogamer Jeffrey Matulef called the game "wonderfully creative", and compared the animatronic animals in the game to Weeping Angels due to their ability to only move when they are not being observed.Five Nights at Freddy's 2 received "mixed or average" reviews according to Metacritic, assigning the Windows version a score of 62 out of 100. Omri Petitte for PC Gamer gave Five Nights at Freddy's 2 a score of 70 out of 100, commenting that what he wanted in the sequel "was more mind games and more uncertainty. I wanted the plodding animatronic suits to find me and rip my face off in new and interesting ways. I wanted working legs. What I got was a horror game dipping heavily into deception and subtlety, a wonderfully cruel cocktail of supernatural mystery and jolts of panicked adrenaline. Enjoying the good parts, though, comes with a cost of a frustratingly steep difficulty." Destructoid also gave the game a positive review, saying that "It's absolutely terrifying to know that you could be attacked at any moment from multiple avenues", praising the introduction of new animatronics and mechanics, but also criticizing the jumpscares and called the game "too hard for its own good". In a review for the Nintendo Switch version of the game in 2019, Mitch Vogel of Nintendo Life said, "Five Nights at Freddy's 2 may not necessarily reinvent the wheel, but it still does a fine job of keeping you on the edge of your seat."Five Nights at Freddy's 3 received "mixed or average" reviews according to Metacritic, assigning the Windows version a score of 68 out of 100. Omri Petitte from PC Gamer gave Five Nights at Freddy's 3 a score of 77 out of 100, praising the reworked camera system, but commented on how the jumpscares from the other animatronics "felt a little stale by the third night." In a more critical review, Nic Rowen from Destructoid gave the game a 6.5 out of 10, saying that even though the game is "by far the most technically proficient and mechanically satisfying installment yet," he criticized Springtrap and Fazbear's Fright for lacking the "charm of the original cast and locations."Five Nights at Freddy's 4 received "mixed or average" reviews according to Metacritic, assigning the Windows version a score of 51 out of 100. Destructoid criticized the gameplay as being too confusing, and gave the game a review score of 4 out of 10. The Escapist gave the game a positive review score of 4 out of 5 stars saying that they liked the reworked mechanics, darker and emotional storyline, scary jumpscares, and sad ending but noted the game's bugs and glitches. Nadia Oxford of Gamezebo gave it 4 out of 5 stars in her review praising it for its intense environment, creepy sounds and graphics, and jumpscares. She criticized the game for being difficult to survive in certain environments when relying on audio cues and the Android version not containing the story-centric minigames.Five Nights at Freddy's: Sister Location received "mixed or average" reviews from critics according to Metacritic, assigning a score of 62 out of 100. Destructoid rated the game 6/10, while GameCrate rated it 7.50/10. Shelby Watson of The All State gave the game a positive review, citing it to be comparable to the first game's quality, but unlike the first game, never allowing the player to operate the mechanics on muscle memory alone. She writes, "...[E]ach night is so different, it is impossible to get comfortable with the mechanics enough that it feels like second nature. The game changes so much, you are forced to adapt and are always on the edge of your seat, waiting for what is to come." TechRaptor rated the game 9/10, calling it "genuinely terrifying" with a "great storytelling" and praised the voice acting.Freddy Fazbear's Pizzeria Simulator received mostly positive reviews. GameCrate called it the "best value in gaming right now", with Rock Paper Shotgun calling it "spooky as hell". The Ball State Daily News also gave a positive review, giving the game a 7.6/10 and calling it "an interesting evolution of the Five Nights [at Freddy's] formula". IGN listed Freddy Fazbear's Pizzeria Simulator in their top 18 Best Horror Games of 2017.Ultimate Custom Night received mostly positive reviews. Rock Paper Shotgun deemed the game "an intriguing mess", with PC Gamer calling it "a neat, customisable take on the classic survival horror formula".Five Nights at Freddy's: Help Wanted received "generally favorable" reviews from critics for the PlayStation 4 version according to Metacritic, assigning a score of 80 out of 100; the Nintendo Switch version received "mixed or average" reviews, with Metacritic assigning a score of 53 out of 100. Reviewers praised the game for its effective use of virtual reality and its success in introducing new mechanics while preserving the series' feel and atmosphere while being accessible for players new to the series. However, the game's frequent use of jump scares could make it less scary and more obnoxious over time for some players. Stuart Gipp at Nintendo Life criticized the Nintendo Switch version of the game and gave it a score of 3 out of 10. The main criticism being that the game had become pointless for having removed the VR mode making it a "sub-par minigame collection" with "limited gameplay" since previous main games were available already for the console, and speculated that the only reason for releasing it for the console were to capitalize on the console's market share. The game is listed as one of PlayStation's "Favorite Horror Games of 2019" on their website and is one of the top 30 best selling VR games on Steam. The game was nominated for the Coney Island Dreamland Award for Best AR/VR Game at the New York Game Awards in 2020.Five Nights at Freddy's: Security Breach received "mixed or average" reviews, according to Metacritic. Jeuxvideo.com gave a mixed review, praising the atmosphere and the originality of certain gameplay sections, but criticizing the bugs and technical issues. The Escapists Ben "Yahtzee" Croshaw was more critical of the game, praising the visuals, but criticizing the bugs, design, and restrictive save system. The game was nominated and won Players' Choice December 2021 on PlayStation's official blog.

Cultural impact
Fandom

Since the release of the first game, the games have become a popular topic of discussion by fans on social media platforms such as Reddit, and are regularly featured on Let's Play videos. Popular video creators, such as PewDiePie, Markiplier, and Jacksepticeye helped the games receive additional attention with their playthroughs. In May 2015, YouTube reported that playthroughs of the Five Nights at Freddy's series were the platform's eighth-most-watched playthroughs. Channels such as The Game Theorists occasionally feature Five Nights at Freddy's-related videos as well, in particular towards the lore of the franchise.

A number of fan games have been inspired by the game mechanics of Five Nights at Freddy's. Fan games for the franchise are incredibly common to the point Game Jolt made FNAF games its own genre to avoid overwhelming the site.

Although the Five Nights at Freddy's fandom has been criticized for immaturity, Cawthon defended them on Steam and criticized the broader community for what he called an unfair generalization.

In September 2020, a video featuring Jack Black dancing to a Five Nights at Freddy's fan song went viral on the social media platform TikTok. Black had previously appeared on an episode of Jimmy Kimmel Live! in April 2020, wearing a mask headpiece modeled after main antagonist William Afton, where he revealed that he is a fan of the Five Nights at Freddy's series. Black and his son Samuel had previously played Five Nights at Freddy's 4 with Markiplier to promote his own film Goosebumps.

MerchandiseFive Nights at Freddy's merchandise is primarily produced by two companies: Sanshee and Funko. Products include stuffed toys, action figures, posters, clothing, keychains, and stationery, among other things. McFarlane Toys also has a line of Five Nights at Freddy's'' merchandise, consisting mainly of construction sets; Todd McFarlane called the line "the single largest selling product, bar none, by a lot that [he's] done in 20-plus years." The merchandise, available internationally, has been a factor in the franchise's success.

References

External links

 
 
 
 
 

 
Windows games
IOS games
Android (operating system) games
PlayStation 4 games
PlayStation 5 games
Xbox Cloud Gaming games
Xbox One games
Xbox Series X and Series S games
Nintendo Switch games
Clickteam Fusion games
Indie video games
Video game franchises
Video game franchises introduced in 2014
Video games about robots
Video games adapted into novels
Video games adapted into comics
Video games adapted into films
Works about missing people
Internet memes introduced in 2014
2010s fads and trends
2020s fads and trends